Quek is a Chinese, English, and German surname.

Origins
The English surname Quek is an alternative spelling of Quick, which originated from Middle English  and earlier Old English , both meaning 'lively' or 'nimble'. Quex and Quekes, toponymic surnames referring to Quex in Kent, are derived from Quek plus the English possessive marker s.

As a Chinese surname, Quek is found in Southeast Asia among Overseas Chinese communities in Malaysia and in Singapore as an approximation of Southern Min pronunciations of the surname whose Standard Mandarin pronunciation is spelled in Hanyu Pinyin as Guō. Other Southern Min-derived spellings of the same surname include Kek, Kerk, Kuek, Kweh, and Kwek.

The German surname Quek is a variant spelling of Queck, which is usually derived from Middle High German  or Middle Low German  " "lively". In some cases it may have originated as an occupational surname for a farmer or a cattle dealer, from  "living animal". Despite the similarity in spelling, based on the geographic distribution of the surname within Germany, it is generally believed to be unrelated to the placename  in Hesse.

Statistics
The 2010 United States Census found 167 people with the surname Quek, making it the 105,6700th-most-common name in the country. This represented an increase from 127 people (124,872nd-most-common) in the 2000 Census. In both censuses, about five percent of the bearers of the surname identified as non-Hispanic white, and about nine-tenths as non-Hispanic Asian or Pacific Islander.

People
Quek Kee Siong (– after 1980), Singaporean man executed for the murder of Cheng Geok Ha
Quek Leng Chan (born 1941), Malaysian businessman
Quek Swee Hwa (born 1941), Singaporean pastor
Deborah Evans-Quek (born 1961), Welsh chess player
Justin Quek (born 1962), Singaporean chef
Phyllis Quek (born 1972), Malaysian model
Grace Quek (born ), Singaporean pornographic actress who used the stage name Annabel Chong
Jill Quek (born 1978), Singaporean footballer
Quek See Ling (born 1986), Singaporean writer
Sam Quek (born 1988), English field hockey player

References

English-language surnames
German-language surnames
Hokkien-language surnames